John William Jones (8 February 1891 – 20 July 1948) was an English professional footballer who played as a left back. He made 331 appearances in the Football League.

Jones was born in 1891 in Rotherham, which was then in the West Riding of Yorkshire. A former coal miner, he was transferred from Sunderland to Birmingham in 1920 for a fee of £2,000. For six seasons he formed a formidable full-back pairing with Frank Womack, helping the club win the Football League Second Division title in the 1920–21 season. He went on to play 237 matches in all competitions for the club, including 191 in the First Division. He later played for Nelson, Crewe Alexandra and Scarborough. He died in Rotherham at the age of 57.

References

1891 births
Footballers from Rotherham
1948 deaths
English footballers
Association football fullbacks
Allerton Bywater Colliery F.C. players
Maltby Main F.C. players
Sunderland A.F.C. players
Birmingham City F.C. players
Nelson F.C. players
Crewe Alexandra F.C. players
Scarborough F.C. players
English Football League players
English Football League representative players